Mario Calire is an American drummer, based in Los Angeles, known for his affiliations with The Wallflowers and Ozomatli and his wide-ranging freelance work.

A native of Buffalo, New York, Calire moved to California when his father, the keyboard and saxophone player Jimmy Calire, had a gig with the band America. Calire and his two brothers were raised in the bohemian Ojai Valley by his father and artist mother.

Calire studied jazz and world music at the California Institute of the Arts. He played frequently around Los Angeles, joining The Wallflowers in 1995 and remaining during the band’s peak years, during which time the band won the Grammy Awards for Best Rock Song and Best Rock Performance by a Duo or Group for the song "One Headlight".

In 2003, Calire joined Los Angeles Latin band Ozomatli. The album, Street Signs, won two Grammys and fueled a career resurgence bolstered by the band's live shows. During Calire's ten-years with the bad, Ozomatli toured throughout the United States, Europe, Japan, Burma, Mongolia, Egypt, Tunisia, Jordan, Lithuania and India. After an amicable split with Ozomatli, Calire began playing with The Wallflowers again as they toured in support of their 2012 record, "Glad All Over". He has since worked as a freelance drummer with artists like Rickie Lee Jones, Liz Phair, Nikka Costa, Brett Dennen, and Pat Green.

He is the brother of the animation director, Jamie Caliri.

Discography

1999 Smooth Sailin' - Marty Grebb - drums
2000 Blues for a Rotten Afternoon]] - Various Artists - drums
2001 Big Slow Mover - Phil Cody - performer
2001 The Ballad of Liverpool Slim - Jackie Lomax - drums
2001 I Am Sam [Bonus Tracks] - Original Soundtrack - drums
2002 I Am Sam [Japanese Bonus Tracks] - Original Soundtrack - drums
2002 I Am Sam - Original Soundtrack - drums
2002 Red Letter Days - The Wallflowers - drums, backing vocals, group member
2002 Trampoline Records Greatest Hits, Vol. 1 - Various Artists - cymbals, drums
2003 Broken Promises - Rusty Truck - drums
2003 Coming Up [EP] - Ozomatli - drums
2003 Evening of My Best Day - Rickie Lee Jones - drums
2003 Liz Phair [Clean] - Liz Phair - drums
2003 Liz Phair - Liz Phair - drums
2003 Trampoline Records Greatest Hits, Vol. 2 - Various Artists - drums
2004 Everything I've Got in My Pocket - Minnie Driver - drums
2004 Street Signs - Ozomatli - drums, group member
2005 Concord Picante 25th Anniversary Collection - Various Artists - drums
2005 Look at All the Love We Found: A Tribute to Sublime - Various Artists - drums
2005 Here Comes Memory - Tom Langford - drums
2005 Over/Time [EP] - Ted Lennon - drums
2005 Live At The Fillmore - Ozomatli - drums
2006 Here Comes Memory - Tom Langford - drums
2006 So Much More -Brett Dennen - drums
2007 Don't Mess with the Dragon - Ozomatli - drums, group member
2007 Jessica Callahan - Jessica Callahan - drums
2007 SXSW Live 2007 - Various Artists	- Drums
2008 Luck's Changing Lanes - Rusty Truck - drums
2009 Collected: 1996–2005 - The Wallflowers - drums
2010 Fire Away - Ozomatli - drums, group member
2012 Ozokidz - Ozomatli - drums, group member
2014 Place In the Sun - Ozomatli - drums

References

1974 births
Living people
American rock drummers
The Wallflowers members
20th-century American drummers
American male drummers
21st-century American drummers
Grammy Award winners